Tsubasa Kina (born 18 May 1990) is a Japanese wheelchair racer, who won the women's wheelchair race at the 2020 and 2021 Tokyo Marathons, and came third at the 2018 Tokyo Marathon. She is the national record holder in the women's wheelchair marathon, and competed at the delayed 2020 Summer Paralympics.

Personal life
Kina is from Okinawa Prefecture, Japan. As a teenager, Kina played basketball. Whilst studying, Kina had an accident that forced her to use a wheelchair.

Career
Kina competed in her first wheelchair marathon in 2013. In 2016, she won the women's race at the Oita International Wheelchair Marathon. In 2017, she won the 800 metres T54 event at the Arizona Grand Prix. Kina came third at the 2018 Tokyo Marathon, in a time of 1:46:17. In 2019, Kina set a personal best time of 1:39:36, which allowed her to qualify for the 2019 Tokyo Marathon. Kina did not finish the race due to a flat tyre. She later finished second at the 2019 Oita International Wheelchair Marathon, in a Japanese national record time of 01:35:50. She beat the previous record by over two minutes.

Kina won the women's wheelchair race at the 2020 Tokyo Marathon, in a time of 01:40:00. The women's wheelchair race had three competitors, and Kina took the lead at the start of the race, and maintained it throughout. It was her first victory at the event, and Kina's winning time was a course record. Part of the Tokyo Marathon course was used for the marathon event at the 2020 Summer Paralympics.

Kina qualified to compete in the marathon T54 at the delayed 2020 Summer Paralympics. At the Games, she finished seventh in the race. Kina won the delayed 2021 Tokyo Marathon; she was one of two finishers at the event.

References

External links
 Olympics.com

1990 births
Japanese female marathon runners
Tokyo Marathon female winners
Sportspeople from Okinawa Prefecture
Living people
Athletes (track and field) at the 2020 Summer Paralympics
21st-century Japanese women